Balkundra is a census town in the Patratu CD block in the Ramgarh subdivision of the Ramgarh district in the state of Jharkhand, India.

Geography

Location

Area overview
Ramgarh has a vibrant coal-mining sector. The map alongside provides links to five operational areas of Central Coalfields spread across South Karanpura Coalfield, Ramgarh Coalfield and West Bokaro Coalfield. Four of the six CD blocks in the district have coal mines – Patratu, Ramgarh, Mandu and Chitarpur. The high concentration of census towns in these blocks are noticeable on the map. Only two blocks, Gola and Dulmi, are totally rural areas. Ramgarh district lies in the central part of the Chota Nagpur Plateau. The Damodar valley covers most of the district. The forested areas in highlands to the north and the south of the valley can be seen in the map (mark the shaded areas). "Chotanagpur has a charm of its own… The entire area forms one of the most charming series of views imaginable. The far-off hills in the background in exquisite tints of blue or purple as the light falls, the nearer hills picturesquely shaped and luxuriant in every shade of green with their bold escarpments in black or grey, and the brown plains below furnishing their quota of colours." 

Note: The map alongside presents some of the notable locations in the district. All places marked in the map are linked in the larger full screen map.

Civic administration

Police station
Basal police station serves Patratu CD block.

Demographics
According to the 2011 Census of India, Balkundra had a total population of 3,915, of which 2,136 (55%) were males and 1,779 (45%) were females. Population in the age range 0-6 years was 484. The total number of literate persons in Balkundra was 2,533 (73.83% of the population over 6 years). 

 India census, Balkundra had a population of 5,369. Males constitute 54% of the population and females 46%. Balkundra has an average literacy rate of 68%, higher than the national average of 59.5%; with 61% of the males and 39% of females literate. 12% of the population is under 6 years of age.

Infrastructure
According to the District Census Handbook 2011, Ramgarh, Balkundra covered an area of 1.187 km2. Among the civic amenities, it had 8 km roads with both open and closed drains, the protected water supply involved uncovered well, hand pump. It had 684 domestic electric connections, 15 road lighting points. Among the medical facilities, it had 3 hospitals, 2 dispensaries, 2 health centres, 8 family welfare centres, 4 maternity and child welfare centres, 8 maternity homes, 5 nursing homes. Among the educational facilities it had 5 primary schools, 1 middle school, 2 secondary schools, 1 senior secondary school, the nearest general degree college at Bhurkunda 3 km away. It had 5 non-formal educational centres (Sarva Siksha Abhiyan). Among the social, recreational and cultural facilities it had 1 stadium. One important commodity it produced was steel. It had the branch offices of 1 nationalised bank, 1 agricultural credit society.

Economy
Jindal Steel and Power has set up a 0.6 million tonnes per year wire rod mill and a 1 million tonnes per year bar mill in Patratu.

Transport
Balkundra is on State Highway 2.

References

Cities and towns in Ramgarh district